Ophiothela mirabilis is a species of ophiurid brittle stars within the family Ophiotrichidae.

Characteristics 
Ophiothela mirabilis is a very minute brittle star, which rarely reaches more than 1 cm including arms. It has in general 6 arms, however because of its mode of reproduction by division (scissiparity), its shape is often very irregular (one half more developed than the other, only 4 or 5 arms, or on the contrary 7 or 8...).

Its coloration is extremely variable and made believe for a long time in a complex of several species: it can thus be orange plain or white mottled with bright colors (in particular yellow and blue) with ringed arms.

All have arms with delicate translucent, thorny spines. The arms are flexible in all directions. The jaws contain clusters of well-developed tooth papillae on the apex but not on the sides. There are no mouth papillae. Inside the mouth edge there is a second pair of tube feet. The dorsal surface of the disc is covered with spines and thorny towers.

The former species Ophiothela danae is now considered a junior synonym of Ophiothela mirabilis.

Distribution
Ophiothela mirabilis is found in the tropical ecosystems of the Indo-Pacific, where it lives coiled, sometimes in hundreds, on larger animals (sponges, echinoderms, gorgonians, corals...).

Recently, it has appeared in the Caribbean, where it seems to be becoming invasive: it has probably been transported by commercial ships.

Gallery

References

 
Gnathophiurina
Echinoderm families